Narciso Busquets Zárate (8 September 1931 – 14 December 1988) was a Mexican actor of theater, film, television, radio and voice-over. He also directed a film, Sin fortuna, in 1980. He began his acting career in 1937, as a child actor, and appeared as one of Cantinflas' sons in Ahí está el detalle. He dubbed the voice of Japanese actor Toshirō Mifune in Spanish in the film Ánimas Trujano, which was nominated for an Academy Award for Best Foreign Language Film.

Among his other contributions in film are El gallo de oro with Ignacio López Tarso and Lucha Villa, Los cuatro Juanes with Luis Aguilar, Pedro Páramo with John Gavin, La soldadera with Silvia Pinal, Jesús, nuestro Señor with Claudio Brook and Valente Quintero with Antonio Aguilar and Saby Kamalich. On television, Busquets had his debut in 1961 and continued to stay steady until 1988. He portrayed José María Morelos in the historical telenovela Los caudillos in 1968.

Selected filmography
 Por mis pistolas (1938)
 The Coward (1939)
 Here's the Point (1940)
 The Unknown Policeman (1942)
 Another Dawn (1943)
 Cuando habla el corazón (1943)
 Los años vacíos (1970)
 Del otro lado del puente (1980)

Dubbed roles
 The Great Mouse Detective - Ratigan
 Sleeping Beauty'' - Narrator (1st dub)

1931 births
1988 deaths
Mexican male television actors
Mexican male voice actors
Mexican male film actors
Mexican people of Catalan descent
Mexican male child actors
20th-century Mexican male actors